The Wied is a river in Rhineland-Palatinate, Germany, and a right tributary of the Rhine.

It flows mainly south-west, through the Westerwald hills. Its source is near Dreifelden. It flows through Altenkirchen, Neustadt (Wied) and Waldbreitbach, and ends in the Rhine in Neuwied.

Tributaries 
Among the tributaries of the Wied are the following:

See also
List of rivers of Rhineland-Palatinate

References

 
Rivers of Rhineland-Palatinate
Rivers of the Westerwald
Rivers of Germany